Ulf Tütken (born 31 May 1943) is a German volleyball player. He competed in the men's tournament at the 1972 Summer Olympics.

References

External links
 

1943 births
Living people
German men's volleyball players
Olympic volleyball players of West Germany
Volleyball players at the 1972 Summer Olympics
People from Delmenhorst
Sportspeople from Lower Saxony
20th-century German people